Statistics of Japan Football League in the 1996 season.

Overview
It was contested by 16 teams, and Honda won the championship. However, citing continuing corporate ownership, they were refused promotion by the J.League, who took in the runner-up, Vissel Kobe, instead.

Newly promoted before the season were Nippon Denso, later known as FC Kariya, and Oita Trinity, later known as Oita Trinita.

League standings

Updated to match(es) played in November 1996. Source: 
Rules for classification: 1) points; 2) goal difference; 3) number of goals scored.
Notes:
Teams in Bold are the J.League associate members
After the season Tosu Futures & Cosmo Oil Yokkaichi folded

References

1996
2
Japan
Japan